Kory Paul Roberts (born 17 December 1997) is an English professional footballer who plays as a defender for Hemel Hempstead Town.

Career
Roberts was born in Birmingham, West Midlands. He joined the Walsall academy at the age of 16 from Birmingham's Sunday football scene, after a failed trial at Birmingham City. He signed his first professional contract with Walsall in May 2016. On 31 December 2016, Roberts made his Football League debut against Oxford United in a 0–0 draw.

He signed a new contract with Walsall in October 2018, running until June 2020.

Following his release from Walsall, he signed for Bromley in September 2020. On 29 September 2021, he signed for National League North side AFC Telford United on a two-month loan deal. On 26 November 2021, he was on the move again, this time to a level below when he signed for Southern Football League Premier Division Central side Rushall Olympic on loan until January 2022.

On 28 January 2022, Roberts joined Dartford on loan.

On 31 May 2022, it was confirmed that Roberts would leave Bromley following the end of his contract.

On 22 July 2022, Roberts signed for Hemel Hempstead Town.

Career statistics

References

External links
Profile at the Walsall F.C. website

1997 births
Living people
Footballers from Birmingham, West Midlands
English footballers
Association football defenders
Walsall F.C. players
Bromley F.C. players
AFC Telford United players
Rushall Olympic F.C. players
Dartford F.C. players
Hemel Hempstead Town F.C. players
English Football League players
National League (English football) players
Southern Football League players